Hyatt Regency Belgrade is a modern 5-star hotel located in New Belgrade, Belgrade, Serbia. It is part of international hotel group Hyatt Regency.

Located across the street from Ušće Tower and Ušće Shopping Center, it is close to both the city centre and Sava Center, and fifteen minutes from Belgrade Nikola Tesla Airport.

History
Hyatt Regency Belgrade was established in August 1990, by the international hotel group Hyatt.

It is a five star hotel; ranked as the most luxurious hotel in the country, with an excellent reputation.

Hyatt Regency Belgrade is well known for its quality, being a hotel that accommodates senior visitors such as diplomats, political figures, actors, etc.

See also
 List of hotels in Serbia
 List of buildings in Belgrade

References

External links
 
 Hyatt Regency Belgrade@TripAdvisor

Hotels in Belgrade
Yugoslav Serbian architecture
Hyatt Hotels and Resorts
Hotels established in 1990
Hotel buildings completed in 1990
New Belgrade